Arega is a civil parish in the municipality of Figueiró dos Vinhos in Leiria District, Portugal. The population in 2011 was 870, in an area of 28.64 km².

References

External links
arega.pt.vu

Parishes of Figueiró dos Vinhos